Glider is an EP by Irish-English rock band My Bloody Valentine, released in April 1990 by Creation Records. The EP was also the group's first release on the Sire Records label in the United States. Containing the lead single "Soon", which featured Kevin Shields' "glide guitar" technique, the EP peaked at number 2 on the UK Indie Chart, and the band toured in summer 1990 to support its release.

An alternate mix of "Soon" was later included on the Loveless album.

Track listing

Also issued as a cassette single (CRESC073) and CD (CRESCD073)

Side B is only listed as "Glider" on the center label

Personnel
My Bloody Valentine
Kevin Shields – guitar, vocals, sampler
Bilinda Butcher – guitar, vocals
Colm Ó Cíosóig – drums
Debbie Googe – bass

Technical personnel
My Bloody Valentine – production
Alan Moulder – engineering
Andrew Weatherall – remixer (second 12-inch)
Designland – sleeve design
Sam Harris – photographer

References

My Bloody Valentine (band) EPs
1990 EPs
Creation Records EPs